Louis McPherson (born October 17, 1995), known professionally as Lil Wop, is an American rapper from Chicago, Illinois who was signed to 1017 Records, a record label founded by American rapper Gucci Mane. He is known for his dark style influenced by the latter.

Personal life 
Lil Wop is the cousin of American rapper Famous Dex. In 2016, he moved to Atlanta from Chicago by a suggestion from his little brother. In February 2022, he came out as bisexual via a post on his Instagram account.

Career 
In 2016, he released his debut project Wopster. In 2017, he dropped his mixtape Wake N Bake. In the summer of 2017, American rapper Gucci Mane signed Lil Wop to his record label 1017 Eskimos in a joint venture with Alamo Records. In April 2017, he released his single "Gotcho Bitch" with his cousin and American rapper Famous Dex. In October 2017, he released a collaborative mixtape with American rapper Trippie Redd titled Angels & Demons. In July 2018, he featured on Toronto rap duo CMDWN's single "Hit & Run". In August 2018, he released his EP Silent Hill which contained open verses. In October 2018, he released his project Wopavelli 4. In March 2022, he insulted his former manager Gucci Mane, calling him a "weirdo" and revealed that he was no longer signed to 1017 Records.

Musical style 
His musical style is compared to rappers the likes of 21 Savage and Young Thug.

Legal issues 
In October 2018, he and American rapper Trippie Redd were arrested after allegedly getting into a physical altercation.

References

External links 
 

Living people
LGBT rappers
LGBT African Americans
LGBT people from Illinois
21st-century LGBT people
21st-century American rappers
African-American male rappers
African-American male songwriters
Rappers from Chicago
Trap musicians
People from Chicago
People from Illinois
Rappers from Illinois
1993 births